Misty may refer to:

Music
 Misty (Ray Stevens album), an album by Ray Stevens featuring the above song
 Misty (Richard "Groove" Holmes album), an album by Richard "Groove" Holmes featuring the above song 
 Misty (Eddie "Lockjaw" Davis album), an album by Eddie "Lockjaw" Davis and Shirley Scott featuring the above song 
 Misty (Harold Mabern album), an album by Harold Mabern featuring the above song
 Misty (Dexter Gordon album), an album by Dexter Gordon featuring the above song 
 Misty, a 1975 album by American jazz singer Chris Connor
 "Misty" (song), by Erroll Garner
 "Misty", a song by Kate Bush from the album 50 Words for Snow

People
Misty is a feminine given name of English origin. It is based on the English word mist.

Given name or nickname
 Misty Copeland (born 1982), American ballerina
 Misty Daniels, American stage actress
 Misty Dawn (born 1963), adult film actress
 Misty Edwards (born 1979), American contemporary Christian musician
 Misty Hyman (born 1979), American swimmer
 Misty Jannat, Bangladeshi actress
 Misty Jean (born c. 1980), Haitian singer and former Miss West Indies
 Misty Jenkins Australian scientist
 Misty Lee (born 1976), American professional magician
 Misty Massey, American fantasy author
 Misty May-Treanor (born 1977), American professional beach volleyball player
 Misty Oldland, British-Swiss singer-songwriter
 Misty Plowright (born 1983), American politician
 Misty Rain, an American pornographic actress, director and exotic dancer
 Mistella Misty Rowe (born 1950), American actress
 Misty Snow (born 1985), American politician
 Misty Stone (born 1986), American pornographic actress and model
 Misty Upham (1982–2014), Native American actress
 Moda Fincher (1924-2006), radio announcer

Fictional characters
 Lacerta Misty, from the manga Saint Seiya
 Misty (Pokémon), from the Pokémon franchise
 Misty Knight, in the Marvel Comics Universe
 Misty Day, from American Horror Story: Coven
 Misty Fey, from the Ace Attorney game series

Other uses
 Misty (satellite program), reportedly a classified United States satellite program
 Misty (comics), a British comic published from 1978 to 1984
 Misty (film), a 1961 adaptation of the book Misty of Chincoteague
 Misty (TV series), a 2018 South Korean television series

See also
 Mist (disambiguation)
 Misty Blue (disambiguation)
 MISTY1, a cryptographic algorithm

English feminine given names
English-language feminine given names
Lists of people by nickname